Itade is a village in the Thane district of Maharashtra, India. It is located in the Bhiwandi taluka.

According to Census 2011 information, the location code or village code of Itade village is 552635. It is situated 15km away from sub-district headquarter Bhiwandi and 38km away from district headquarter Thane.

The total geographical area of village is 51.19 hectares. Itade has a total population of 1,245 people. There are about 247 houses in Itade village. As per 2019 stats, Itade villages comes under Bhiwandi Rural assembly & Bhiwandi parliamentary constituency. Kalyan is nearest town to Itade, approximately 10 km away.

Demographics 

According to the 2011 census of India, Itade has 247 households. The effective literacy rate (i.e. the literacy rate of population excluding children aged 6 and below) is 77.69%.

References 

Villages in Bhiwandi taluka